The Women's shot put at the 2010 Commonwealth Games as part of the athletics programme was held at the Jawaharlal Nehru Stadium on Saturday 9 October 2010.

Records

Results

References

External links
2010 Commonwealth Games - Athletics

Women's shot put
2010
2010 in women's athletics